The Battle Creek River (simply Battle Creek on federal maps) is a river in the U.S. state of Michigan. It is a tributary of the Kalamazoo River, joining it at Battle Creek, Michigan; the Kalamazoo River empties into Lake Michigan.

The headwaters of the Battle Creek River are at Duck Lake in Clarence Township in northeast Calhoun County, and the stream flows north to the city of Charlotte, then southwest through the village of Bellevue and empties into the Kalamazoo River at the city of Battle Creek. Tributaries of the Battle Creek River include Wanadoga Creek, Ellis Creek, Crooked Brook, Goose Creek, Ackley Creek, Indian Creek, and Big Creek.

Toponym 

The river's name, according to local lore, was given after a survey party, led by Col. John Mullet, engaged in hostilities with some local Native Americans in the winter of 1823–24.

See also
List of Michigan rivers

References

Rivers of Michigan
Rivers of Calhoun County, Michigan
Rivers of Eaton County, Michigan
Tributaries of Lake Michigan